A Feast in the Time of Plague (opera)

may refer to:

A Feast in  Time of Plague, 1900 opera by César Cui
or
A Feast in the Time of Plague, 2020 opera by Alex Woolf.